The Town is a 2010 American crime drama film co-written, directed by, and starring Ben Affleck, adapted from Chuck Hogan's 2004 novel Prince of Thieves. It also stars Rebecca Hall, Jon Hamm, Jeremy Renner, Blake Lively, Titus Welliver, Pete Postlethwaite, Chris Cooper and Slaine, and follows a Boston bank robber who begins to develop romantic feelings for a victim of one of his previous robberies, while he and his crew set out to get one final score by robbing Fenway Park.

The film premiered on September 8, 2010, at the Venice Film Festival before being released in the United States on September 17, 2010. Based on actual events, it received praise from critics for its direction, screenplay, editing, and the performances of the cast (particularly Renner) and grossed $154 million worldwide. The film was chosen by the National Board of Review as one of the top ten films of 2010, while Renner was nominated for the Academy Award for Best Supporting Actor and Postlethwaite was posthumously nominated for the BAFTA Award for Best Supporting Actor.

Plot
Four lifelong friends from the neighborhood of Charlestown, Boston, Douglas "Doug" MacRay, James "Jem" Coughlin, Albert "Gloansy" MacGloan, and Desmond "Dez" Elden, rob a bank. Against the wishes of Doug, Jem takes bank manager Claire Keesey hostage but later release her unharmed.

After finding out that Claire lives in their neighborhood, Doug follows her to find out how much she has told the police and to ensure that the hot-headed Jem does not eliminate her as a witness. Soon, a romance grows between them, which Doug hides from the gang.

As the two grow closer, he tells Claire of his search for his long-lost mother, who he believes went to live with his aunt in Tangerine, Florida. He also almost became a professional ice hockey player before he threw it away to follow in his father's footsteps as a bank robber. Claire tells Doug she saw a tattoo on one of the robbers but did not tell the FBI, and he realizes that she can identify Jem and send them all to prison.

Jem will kill her if he knows and so to dissuade her, Doug tells her if she tells the police, they will then put her in witness protection and send her to live in another state. His plan works, and she does not talk.

FBI Special Agent Adam Frawley recognizes their ties to local Irish mobster Fergus "Fergie" Colm, whose front is a florist's. During a visit to his father, Stephen, in prison, Doug shares his plan to leave Boston for Florida. Their next job, an armored car robbery in the North End, goes awry, and they barely escape. Frawley interrogates them but fails to get confessions and is forced to release them.

Doug asks Claire to go away with him, and she accepts. When Frawley learns Claire quit her job, he taps her phone, shows his file on Doug to her, and threatens to prosecute her as an accomplice after he realizes that they are together. Shocked that Doug was one of her assailants, she cooperates with the FBI and breaks up with him. He tries to back out of the next heist at Fenway Park. Angered, Jem fights him and says that he is in too deep to walk away. Fergie then threatens to kill Claire if Doug does not do the job, and he reveals to him that he controlled his father by making his mother an addict, which led to her suicide. Doug reluctantly agrees but swears that he will kill Fergie if anything happens to Claire.

At Fenway, Doug and Jem enter disguised as Boston police officers, steal $3,500,000 in gate cash, and prepare to escape in an ambulance while disguised as paramedics. The FBI, having received information from Doug's ex-girlfriend and Jem's single-mom sister Krista, whom Frawley had threatened, surrounds the perimeter with the Boston police and State police. Caught in a firefight with FBI SWAT operators, Dez and Gloansy are killed. Frawley spots Jem and they exchange gunfire in which Jem is wounded in the leg and takes cover behind a mailbox. Determined to not go back to prison, Jem commits suicide by cop by running out with empty guns in hand.

Knowing that Claire is in danger and that he will never escape as long as Fergie is alive, Doug heads to his shop and murders both him and his bodyguard Rusty and calls Claire. Watching from across the street via binoculars, he sees the FBI are with her as she tells him to come over. At first, he thinks she means to betray him, but she gives a clue verbally to warn him away. Doug flees by donning an MBTA uniform and escaping on a train. Frawley deduces that Claire tipped him off, but her tip is too cryptic to provide grounds for an arrest.

Later, while she is gardening, Claire finds a buried bag containing money, a tangerine, and a note from Doug that suggests that she can make better use of the money than he can and that they might see each other again. Claire donates the money, in memory of Doug's mother, to refurbish the local ice hockey arena in which Doug once played. From the deck of a small house, Doug looks out over the water, forlorn, but seemingly safe in Florida.

Cast
 Ben Affleck as Douglas "Doug" MacRay
 Rebecca Hall as Claire Keesey
 Jon Hamm as FBI Special Agent Adam Frawley
 Jeremy Renner as James "Jem" Coughlin
 Blake Lively as Krista "Kris" Coughlin
 Chris Cooper as Stephen "Big Mac" MacRay
 Pete Postlethwaite as Fergus "Fergie" Colm
 Slaine as Albert "Gloansy" MacGloan
 Owen Burke as Desmond "Dez" Elden
 Titus Welliver as Detective Dino Ciampa
 Dennis McLaughlin as Russell "Rusty"
 Brian Scannell as Henry
 Isaac Bordoy as Alex Colazzo
 Jack Neary as Arnold Washton
 Edward O'Keefe as Morton Previt
 Victor Garber as David

Production

Pre-production
In 2003, Paramount Pictures had optioned the rights to Chuck Hogan's novel Prince of Thieves before it was even published, and Dick Wolf signed on to produce before the project fell through. In 2006, director Adrian Lyne brought the novel to producer Graham King. King in turn showed it to Warner Bros. studio, who agreed to make an adaptation directed by Lyne and written by Sheldon Turner. Lynn's vision for the project was a 3-3.5 hour Martin Scorsese styled film with a budget of 90 million dollars, this led to creative differences with the studio and the eventual departure of Lynn from the project. By 2008, The Town was decided as the title and Ben Affleck, fresh off his directorial debut in Gone Baby Gone, was brought in by Warner Bros. to serve as the films star, director and co-writer. Affleck wanted to direct a movie "I personally researched and understood", and invited high school classmate Aaron Stockard to work with him on the script. While Affleck had grown up in nearby Cambridge, Massachusetts, he barely knew the harsh inner-city environment of Charlestown. Affleck and Stockard conducted many interviews with the Charlestown community, as well as the FBI Violent Crimes Task Force in Boston. Later the film's actors also researched within the community to make for more believable characters and performances. Charlestown locals also joined the cast, mostly as extras.

Filming

Filming began in late August 2009 in Boston. The former MASSBank branch located in Melrose, Massachusetts, was used as the location for the first robbery of the film, taking on the name Cambridge Merchants Bank (the exterior shots, however, are of Cambridge Savings Bank in Harvard Square). Filming also took place at Mohegan Sun in Uncasville, Connecticut, for casino scenes, Massachusetts Correctional Institution – Cedar Junction in Walpole, Massachusetts, for use of their visiting room, and at Anderson Regional Transportation Center in Woburn, Massachusetts, for the ending Amtrak scenes.

Release
The Town was shown at the Venice Film Festival and premiered at Boston's Fenway Park. The film was released in the United States on September 17, 2010.

Box office
The film took #1 at the box office during its opening weekend, taking in $23.8 million. The Town grossed $92.1 million in the United States and Canada with an additional $61.8 million in other territories for a total of $154 million worldwide on a production budget of $37 million.

Home media
The film was released on Blu-ray Disc and DVD on December 17, 2010. Both versions include special features and an audio commentary including a look at Affleck as a director and actor. The extended/unrated version is a Blu-ray/DVD/Digital Copy bundle which includes 28 minutes of additional footage, taking the runtime to over 153 minutes.

On March 6, 2011, the three-disc The Town: Ultimate Collector's Edition DVD/Blu-ray set was released. This set includes the previously released theatrical and extended cut Blu-ray disc as well as a second Blu-ray disc and a DVD which feature a new extended cut with an alternate, darker ending.

2012 re-release
On February 5, 2012, to promote the upcoming The Town: Ultimate Collector's Edition set, the AMC Loews Boston Common theater hosted an "exclusive engagement" of The Town (Take 2), wherein three showings of the film were shown with the alternate ending featured in the new home media release. Immediately preceding each screening, a vice president from Warner Bros. Home Entertainment thanked all those in attendance, including Titus Welliver (Dino Ciampa), Dennis McLaughlin (Rusty), and Affleck's mother, for coming out and supporting director Affleck's "preferred" version of the film, leading to a short, prerecorded introduction by Affleck himself. Earlier that day, the intersection of Tremont and Avery streets was temporarily renamed "The Town Take 2 Place" in a small ceremony, attended by Welliver and Boston city officials.

Reception

Critical response
On review aggregator Rotten Tomatoes, The Town has an approval rating of 92% based on 235 reviews, with an average rating of 7.70/10. The site's critical consensus reads, "Tense, smartly written, and wonderfully cast, The Town proves that Ben Affleck has rediscovered his muse—and that he's a director to be reckoned with." Metacritic gives the film a weighted average score of 74 out of 100, based on 42 critics, indicating "generally favorable reviews". Audiences polled by CinemaScore gave the film an average grade of "B+" on an A+ to F scale.

Roger Ebert gave the film 3 out of 4 stars, praising Renner's performance and Affleck's direction. In his review for The New York Times, A. O. Scott commented on the opening heist, "That sequence, like most of the other action set pieces in the film, is lean, brutal and efficient, and evidence of Mr. Affleck's skill and self-confidence as a director." Xan Brooks, in The Guardian, wrote that the action sequences were "sharply orchestrated" but added "it's a bogus, bull-headed enterprise all the same; a film that leaves no cliche untrampled." Justin Chang wrote in Variety that the action scenes strike "an ideal balance between kineticism and clarity" aided by cinematographer Robert Elswit and film editor Dylan Tichenor. Richard Roeper of the Chicago Sun Times gave the film an A+, noting that he found the film incredibly similar to Michael Mann's Heat, which he described as "one of [his] favorite movies of all time." The reviewers at Spill.com also praised one of the shootout scenes, saying "It is surely the best shootout scene we have seen in decades."  Writing in the Seattle Post-Intelligencer, Laremy Lengel titled his review "The Town Works Best if You Avoid the Heat," also referencing Mann's film.

As a Boston-based crime drama, the film forms part of a "crime-movie subgenre" typically marked by "flavorsome accents, pungent atmosphere and fatalistic undertow", according to Chang. Within that subgenre, which includes The Boondock Saints, The Departed, Mystic River and Affleck's Gone Baby Gone, The Town is more of a straightforward crime-procedural and has a more optimistic outlook. The film also takes influence from Boston bank robbery film The Friends of Eddie Coyle; several scenes in The Town, including the release of the blindfolded hostage to walk to the water's edge, mirror sequences in this film.

Accolades

Factual accuracy

A voice in the trailer of the film says: "There are over 300 bank robberies in Boston every year. Most of these professionals live in a 1-square-mile neighborhood called Charlestown." In fact, there were 23 reported bank robberies in the entire state of Massachusetts in the first quarter of 2010, compared with 49 in Illinois and 136 in California, according to the FBI.

The film ends with a written disclaimer: "Charlestown's reputation as a breeding ground for armed robbers is authentic. However, this film all but ignores the great majority of the residents of Charlestown, past and present, who are the same good and true people found most anywhere," to whom the film is dedicated.

According to a September 2010 article in The Boston Globe, Charlestown was once known as an area where bank robbers were concentrated, but has not been since the mid-1990s, and the subject has been a sore point for "Townies". Now much of the neighborhood has been gentrified. The paper reported there is some sense of rivalry between Townies, people who lived in the historically Irish-Catholic neighborhood for decades, and "Toonies", largely white-collar workers who arrived with gentrification, but most of that has died down. The film makes reference to the definition of "Toonies" during one of Doug and Claire's dates.

In the early 1990s, an increase in the number of bank and armored car robberies by Townies focused attention on Charlestown. In one heist in Hudson, New Hampshire, two guards were killed, and is alluded to in the film - during a scene where Agent Frawley is briefing his task force, he mentions that Doug's father is serving life for a notorious robbery in Nashua. According to Frawley, the elder MacRay hijacked a "bread truck" (armored car) up to New Hampshire, and when one of the guards saw his face, he executed both of them with their own weapons. Frawley notes that this incident led to the passing of regulations prohibiting the driver from leaving the cab even if his partner is being held at gunpoint. Charles Hogan got the idea for his novel, on which the film is based, in 1995. "It was just so remarkable that this one very small community was the focus for bank robbers," he said, but he was very aware that crime was only one part of the community, and he did not want to make all residents of the neighborhood look like criminals.

See also
Heist film
Hood film

References

External links

 
 
 
 
 

2010 films
2010 crime thriller films
2010s American films
2010s English-language films
2010s gang films
2010s heist films
American crime thriller films
American gang films
American heist films
Charlestown, Boston
Fictional portrayals of the Boston Police Department
Films about bank robbery
Films about the Federal Bureau of Investigation
Films about murderers
Films based on American crime novels
Films directed by Ben Affleck
Films produced by Basil Iwanyk
Films produced by Graham King
Films scored by Harry Gregson-Williams
Films scored by David Buckley
Films set in Boston
Films set in Massachusetts
Films shot in Connecticut
Films shot in Boston
Films shot in Massachusetts
Films with screenplays by Ben Affleck
Films with screenplays by Peter Craig
GK Films films
Legendary Pictures films
Thunder Road Films films
Warner Bros. films